In geometry, a right conoid is a ruled surface generated by a family of straight lines that all intersect perpendicularly to a fixed straight line, called the axis of the right conoid.

where  is some function for representing the height of the moving line.

Examples

A typical example of right conoids is given by the parametric equations
 

The image on the right shows how the coplanar lines generate the right conoid.

Other right conoids include:
Helicoid: 
Whitney umbrella: 
Wallis's conical edge: 
Plücker's conoid: 
hyperbolic paraboloid:  (with x-axis and y-axis as its axes).

See also 

 Conoid
 Helicoid
 Whitney umbrella
 Ruled surface

External links
 
 Right Conoid from MathWorld.
 Plücker's conoid from MathWorld

Surfaces
Geometric shapes